The Singles: 1974–1978 is a compilation album by American pop duo the Carpenters containing some of their singles released in the years mentioned in the title. It was released internationally, reaching #2 on the UK Albums Chart, but the declining popularity of the Carpenters in the U.S. prevented a release in that country.  Contrary to the album's title, two of the included tracks ("Happy" and "Can't Smile Without You") were not actually released as singles, while one commercial single ("Goofus") was omitted. One of the songs ("I Won't Last a Day Without You") was originally recorded in 1972 for inclusion on their album "A Song for You". It was eventually released as a single in 1974 and became a hit, so it was included here.

Track listing
"Sweet, Sweet Smile" – 3:00
"Jambalaya (On the Bayou)" – 3:41
"Can't Smile Without You" – 3:23
"I Won't Last a Day Without You" – 3:47
"All You Get from Love Is a Love Song" – 3:45
"Only Yesterday" – 4:10
"Solitaire" – 4:39
"Please Mr. Postman" – 2:50
"I Need to Be in Love" – 3:31
"Happy" – 3:49
"There's a Kind of Hush (All Over the World)" – 2:57
"Calling Occupants of Interplanetary Craft" – 7:06

References

The Carpenters compilation albums
1978 compilation albums